Fursenko may refer to:

 Sergey Fursenko
 Andrei Fursenko
 6753 Fursenko